A counter is a gameplay mechanic used in collectible card games (CCG) that physically represents an effect generated by a card. It is represented by any number of small objects, usually glass beads, coins, dice, or bingo chips. They are typically placed on the card generating the counter.  This effect may be a count tally for keeping track of things like monitoring a life total, hit points, or a status of a card.

These counters should not be confused with effects that negate or stop a card or effect from being played, in other words a counteractive card.

Types of counters

Creature counter - also known as token creatures that are generated by cards.
Time counter - a starting amount of counters is placed on a card. One counter is removed at designated intervals, usually during the player's turn. An effect takes place when the final counter is removed.
Accumulative counter - when enough counters have been accumulated an effect occurs.  The required number of counters is usually removed, with some cards continuing to accumulate counters.
Life counter - a counter used to represent the life total of a player
Status counter - a counter used to designate a status of a card, or some other game attribute

References

Collectible card games
Digital collectible card games